
Gmina Suraż is an urban-rural gmina (administrative district) in Białystok County, Podlaskie Voivodeship, in north-eastern Poland.

Villages
Apart from the town of Suraż, Gmina Suraż contains the villages and settlements of Doktorce, Końcowizna, Kowale, Lesznia, Ostasze, Ostrów, Rynki, Średzińskie, Zawyki, Zawyki-Ferma, Zimnochy-Susły and Zimnochy-Świechy.

Neighbouring gminas
Gmina Suraż is bordered by the gminas of Juchnowiec Kościelny, Łapy, Poświętne, Turośń Kościelna and Wyszki.

References
Polish official population figures 2006

Suraz
Białystok County